The 8th Micronesian Games were held from July 20 to July 30, 2014, in Pohnpei, Federated States of Micronesia (FSM).

The Games began with an opening ceremony on the track and field grounds. They included "traditional war dances", and the unfurling of the Games flag in the air as it was delivered by parachute.

At the closing of the Games, Guam had topped the medal table with eighty-one medals, of which forty-two were gold.

Participating countries
All Micronesian nations, states and territories participated in the Games. The host country was represented by four teams, one for each of its federated states: Chuuk, Kosrae, Pohnpei and Yap. The other participants included four independent countries (Kiribati, the Marshall Islands, Nauru, Palau) and two unincorporated organised territories of the United States: the Northern Mariana Islands and Guam. The 2014 Games were the second hosted by the FSM, the 2002 Games having also taken place in Pohnpei State.

The scheduling of the Games conflicted with the 2014 Commonwealth Games in Glasgow, which began on 23 July. Two Micronesian countries, Kiribati and Nauru, are members of the Commonwealth of Nations, and thus had to split their athletes between the two events, both of which they were participating in. (See Kiribati at the 2014 Commonwealth Games and Nauru at the 2014 Commonwealth Games.)

Sports
Participants competed in fourteen sports, reportedly a record. The tournament included football, which had also been played in the 1998 edition, with the explicit aim for some of the teams to improve their credentials and gain associate member status with FIFA. At the time of the Games, the only Micronesian country or territory to be a member of FIFA was Guam.

The sports were: athletics, baseball, basketball, football, the "Micronesian all-around", softball, spearfishing, swimming, volleyball, table tennis, tennis, va'a (canoeing), weightlifting, and wrestling.

For results by sport, see:
 Athletics at the 2014 Micronesian Games

Medal table
The final medal table was as follows. Only Kiribati failed to obtain any medals.

References

Micro
Micronesian Games
2014
Micro
International sports competitions hosted by the Federated States of Micronesia
July 2014 sports events in Oceania